Petre Mitu (born 22 March 1977 in Bucharest) is a Romanian former rugby union fullback. A one time captain of the national team, Mitu played as both a fullback and scrum half during his career. He was also their goalkicker, helping Romania qualify for the 1999 Rugby World Cup with 80 points during qualifying.

An injury in 2001 saw him lose the goalkicking duties to Ionut Tofan and soon after he announced his retirement despite being just 25 years of age. He finished his international career with 34 caps for Romania and a total of 288 points (the highest total for a scrum half, as of October 2008).

Honours

Club
Steaua Bucharest
SuperLiga champion: 1998/99

International
Romania
European Nations Cup (3): 2000, 2002, 2006

External links
 
 
 

1977 births
Living people
Rugby union players from Bucharest
Romanian rugby union players
Rugby union fullbacks
Rugby union scrum-halves
CSA Steaua București (rugby union) players
FC Grenoble players
Tarbes Pyrénées Rugby players
Romania international rugby union players
Romanian expatriate sportspeople in France
Romanian expatriate rugby union players
Expatriate rugby union players in France
Stade Aurillacois Cantal Auvergne players
US Montauban players